Land-O-Sun is an American brand of dairy products that was introduced  in 1925 in Johnson City, Tennessee.  It was acquired in 1998 by Suiza Foods for $224 million.  It is currently owned by Dean Foods and doing business as Pet Dairies.

Legal issues
In 1992, Land-O-Sun entered a guilty plea with the United States Department of Justice, agreeing to pay a $3.5 million fine for public school bid rigging in South Carolina between 1985 and 1988.

References

Dairy products companies of the United States
Companies that filed for Chapter 11 bankruptcy in 2019